Nickells Mill is an unincorporated community in Monroe County, West Virginia, United States. Nickells Mill is east of Alderson.

References

Unincorporated communities in Monroe County, West Virginia
Unincorporated communities in West Virginia